Vittina coromandeliana, also known as Neritina coromandeliana, is a species of a freshwater snail, an aquatic gastropod mollusk in the family Neritidae.

Distribution
Distribution of Vittina coromandeliana includes Indonesia and Philippines.

Description

Human use
Vittina coromandeliana is a part of ornamental pet trade for freshwater aquaria.

References

External links

Neritidae
Gastropods described in 1836
Taxobox binomials not recognized by IUCN